James Sinclair Smith (December 27, 1816 – October 4, 1897) was a farmer, livestock breeder and political figure in Ontario, Canada. He represented Middlesex North in the Legislative Assembly of Ontario as a Liberal member from 1867 to 1874.

He was born in Caithness, Scotland in 1816. He served as reeve of McGillivray Township in Middlesex County. He was defeated by John McDougall in the 1875 general election.

Smith was postmaster at Maple Lodge in Middlesex County.

His son Alexander served in the Canadian House of Commons. He died (supposedly) at McGillivray in 1897.

References

External links

1816 births
1897 deaths
Mayors of places in Ontario
Ontario Liberal Party MPPs
People from Caithness
People from Middlesex County, Ontario
Scottish emigrants to pre-Confederation Ontario